J. P. Primm (born September 17, 1989) is an American basketball player, having previously played for the men's basketball teams of the UNC Asheville Bulldogs.

Career
In September 2012 Primm went on tryout with BC Kyiv, after he was waived by JSF Nanterre. On September 25, Kyiv decided to keep Primm. He was fired after 9 games, in which he averaged 3.1 points per game. In the summer of 2013, he played for the Titanes del Ley in the Dominican Republic.

In February 2014, he signed with the Dutch team Den Helder Kings.

References

External links
 RealGM Profile
 Eurobasket profile

1989 births
Living people
American expatriate basketball people in the Netherlands
American expatriate basketball people in Ukraine
Basketball players from Tennessee
BC Kyiv players
Den Helder Kings players
Dutch Basketball League players
Point guards
UNC Asheville Bulldogs men's basketball players
People from Dickson, Tennessee
American men's basketball players